George Edwards may refer to:

Academics
 George Edwards (marching band director) (1948–2009), director of bands for Prairie View A&M University
 George Edwards (naturalist) (1694–1773), English naturalist and ornithologist
 George C. Edwards III (born 1947), American academic and political scientist

Arts 
 George Edwards, born Ethan Kenning, American singer with late 1960s psychedelic rock band H. P. Lovecraft
 George Edwards (actor) (1886–1953), Australian actor
 George Edwards (architect), British architect
 George Edwards (producer) (1924–1991), American film producer and writer
 George Wharton Edwards (1859–1950), American impressionist painter and illustrator

Law 
 George Clifton Edwards Jr. (1914–1995), U.S. federal judge

Medicine 
 George Nelson Edwards (1830–1868), English writer and physician

Military
 George Edwards (British Army officer) (1795–?), lieutenant assigned to the Brisbane Convict settlement in the 1830s

Politicians

Australia
 George Edwards (Australian politician) (1855–1911), member of the Australian House of Representatives

United Kingdom
 Sir George Edwards (British politician) (1850–1933), English trade unionist and Labour MP for South Norfolk 1920–1922 and 1923–1924

United States
 George C. Edwards (born 1948), member of the Maryland State Senate
 George H. Edwards (1860–1941), mayor of Kansas City, Missouri, 1916–1917

Sports

Cricket
 George Edwards (cricketer) (born 1992), English cricketer with Surrey County Cricket Club

Association football
 George Edwards (footballer, born 1918) (1918–1993), English striker for Aston Villa
 George Edwards (Welsh footballer) (1920–2008), former Welsh international footballer

American football
 George Edwards (American football) (born 1967), American football coach
 George Edwards, known as Big Bertha Edwards, American football player and coach
 George R. Edwards (1890–1972), American football and basketball coach

Other sports
 George Edwards (Australian footballer) (1927–1991), Australian rules footballer 
 George Edwards (jockey) (1805–1851), English jockey

Business 
 Sir George Edwards (aviation) (1908–2003), British aviation designer and industrialist
 George W. Edwards (born 1939), sixteenth president of the Kansas City Southern Railway

Others 
 George Edwards (around 1820), alleged government spy and agent provocateur in the Cato Street Conspiracy
 George Edwards (writer) (1752–1823), physician and writer
 George D. Edwards (1890–1974), first president of the American Society for Quality

See also
 George Edwards Brown (1780–1848), British doctor and businessman, founder of the Chilean Edwards family